Nikolaos Kylafis  is a Greek Theoretical Astrophysicist, who is professor emeritus at the Department of Physics of the University of Crete, Greece.

Kylafis contributed to the founding of the Astrophysics Group of the University of Crete and the Foundation for Research & Technology - Helas (FORTH) in 1985 and led, together with his colleague Ioannis Papamastorakis, the effort to create the Institute of Astrophysics at FORTH in 2018. He has been teaching undergraduate and graduate courses in the Department of Physics since 1985. He has published research works in refereed journals.

Education 
Nikolaos (Nick) Kylafis was born in Nea Avorani, Greece, on 1 January 1949, where he grew up. In 1966 he was admitted at the Department of Physics of the University of Patras and graduated in 1971. The next year he started his graduate studies in the US at the University of Illinois from where he received his master's degree in 1973 and PhD  in 1978. His PhD dissertation was entitled "X and UV radiation from accreting non-magnetic degenerate dwarfs" and it was completed under the supervision of Donald Q. Lamb.

Academic career 
After a short break to complete his compulsory military service in Greece, Kylafis continued his academic career as a postdoctoral fellow at  Caltech (1979-1981), where he collaborated with Peter Goldreich and contributed to the discovery  of the so-called Goldreich-Kylafis effect. He then moved as a member to the  Institute for Advanced Study at Princeton (1981-1984), where he collaborated with John N. Bahcall on topics related to radiative transfer in dusty disk galaxies. He worked for a year as an assistant professor at Columbia University in New York City, before returning as a faculty member at the Department of Physics of the University of Crete. He was promoted to full professor in 1997 and served as Chairman of the department as well as Dean of the School of Natural Sciences. He retired in 2016 and became emeritus professor. In 2018, he was elected to the Council of the European Astronomical Society, where he is currently serving as treasurer. In 2019, he was awarded the outstanding teaching prize "Stelios  Pichorides" by the University of Crete.

Academic recognition 
In 2019, on the occasion of his 70th birthday, the Institute of Astrophysics of FORTH founded the "Nick Kylafis Lectureship" in recognition of his 35 years of scientific and administrative leadership, which contributed to the creation of the Institute of Astrophysics in 2018. Under the auspices of the Lectureship, one distinguished Theoretical Astrophysicist is invited annually at FORTH for a brief visit.

The scientists who have been awarded the Lectureship are:

 2019, Rashid Sunyaev, Director Emeritus at  the Max Planck Institute for Astrophysics, Germany
 2020, Joseph Silk, Professor Emeritus at University of Oxford, UK
 2021, Ewine van Dishoeck, Professor at Leiden University, The Netherlands
 2022, Françoise Combes,  Chair of Galaxies and Cosmology at Collège de France and Astronomer, Classe Exceptionnelle, at Observatoire de Paris, France

Scientific contributions 
Kylafis has contributed to topics related to the production and transfer of radiation in spiral galaxies, in accretion disks around neutron stars and black holes, as well as in astrophysical MASERs. His most known work is the  Goldreich-Kylafis effect, which predicts that, under special conditions, the spectral lines emitted by interstellar molecules should be linearly polarized and the linear polarization vector should reveal the magnetic field direction in the molecular cloud. Other discoveries include the empirical explanation of the physical mechanisms that take place during the accretion and ejection of mass from binary systems which include a black hole and the proof that  the different physical processes that take place in these systems are  correlated.

Selected publications 
 Kylafis, N.D.,  Bahcall, J. N., "Dust Distribution in Spiral Galaxies", 1987, ApJ, 317, 637
 Xilouris, E. M.; Byun, Y. I.; Kylafis, N. D.; Paleologou, E. V.; Papamastorakis, J. "Are spiral galaxies optically thin or thick?", 1999, A&A, 344, 868
 Titarchuk, L.; Mastichiadis, A.; Kylafis, N. D., "X-Ray Spectral Formation in a Converging Fluid Flow: Spherical Accretion into Black Holes", 1997 ApJ, 487, 834
 Goldreich, P.; Kylafis, N. D., "On mapping the magnetic field direction in molecular clouds by polarization measurements", 1981, ApJ, 243, 75
 Kylafis, N. D.; Lamb, D. Q., "X-ray and UV radiation from accreting degenerate dwarfs", 1982, ApJS, 48, 239

References 

Greek astrophysicists
Academic staff of the University of Crete
People from Aetolia-Acarnania
1949 births
Living people
California Institute of Technology fellows
University of Patras alumni
University of Illinois Urbana-Champaign faculty